The Twins at St Clare's is a children's novel by Enid Blyton set in an English girls' boarding school. It is the first of the original six novels in the St. Clare's series of school stories. First published in 1941, it tells the story of twin sisters Pat and Isabel O'Sullivan in their first term at a new school. They meet many new friends.

Plot summary
The two girl twins, Pat and Isabel O'Sullivan, having just finished school at the elite school Redroofs, are expected to move on to senior school. While most of their friends at their old school (including Mary and Frances Waters) are moving to the equally elite Ringmere, the twins' parents are reluctant to send them to an expensive school as they are afraid the twins might become spoilt and snobbish. Furious at their parents' refusal to send them to the school of their choice, the twins are determined to be as difficult as possible at St. Clare's.

The twins miss their favourite sports of field hockey and tennis because only lacrosse is played at St Clare's. However, Pat turns out to be quite good at lacrosse. She is selected by sports captain Belinda Towers despite having defied her earlier.

The twins soon make good friends with the other girls and play pranks on others in the school. Most pranks are directed at Miss Kennedy, their new history teacher, who is a very timid and insecure though highly qualified. One of the pranks for Miss Kennedy is discovered by Miss Roberts, and she punishes the whole form as a result. The class stops playing tricks on Miss Kennedy when the twins overhear her talking to a friend about giving up her job, despite needing the money to help her sick mother, because she cannot control the class.

References

External links
 Enid Blyton Society page

1941 British novels
Methuen Publishing books
St. Clare's novels
Twins in fiction
Fictional twins
Novels set in boarding schools
1941 children's books